Yunderup may refer to two places:

North Yunderup, Western Australia
South Yunderup, Western Australia